Cuba–Malaysia relations refers to bilateral foreign relations between Cuba and Malaysia. Diplomatic relations were established on 6 February 1975, Cuba opened its embassy in Kuala Lumpur on 1997, while Malaysia opened its representation in Havana in February 2001. Both are the members of Group of 77, Non-Aligned Movement and United Nations.

Cultural exchange 

The Casa Cuba in Malacca, built in 2007 as an initiative of the Cuban Embassy in Malaysia, is an art gallery dedicated to works by Cuban artists. The gallery is located in a building which was formerly a senior government officer's residence during British Malaya.

Economic relations 
In 2001, Cuba was granted US$10m palm oil credit facility by Malaysia to purchase 35,000 tonnes of palm oil under the Palm Oil Credit and Payment Arrangement (POCPA) scheme. Both countries co-operate in the area of biotechnology in the field of research and production of vaccines. The Cuban government has provide a scholarships for Malaysian students to pursue their medical studies and humanities in Cuba. Until 2014, the relations are limited to biotechnology and culture, thus Cuba announced their interest to expand the relations more further towards other fields such as healthcare, tourism and education. In 2016, the Malaysian side also keen to expand their bilateral relations with the invitation of Cuban companies to participate in major trade shows organised by the country each year and ratified the position of their country against the economic blockade to the Caribbean nation. In 2018, Cuba extended their invitation to Malaysia to explore the possibility of producing Cuban vaccines in the country.

Further reading 
  Cubanos residentes en Malasia celebran natalicio de Martí y 55 Aniversario de la Revolución. Nación y Emigración

References

External links 
 Embassy of Cuba in Malaysia with concurrent accreditations to Philippines and Brunei Ministry of Foreign Affairs (Cuba)

 
Malaysia
Bilateral relations of Malaysia